John Frederick Leo Petterson (24 March 1897 – 22 May 1956) was an Australian rules footballer who played with Collingwood in the Victorian Football League (VFL).

Notes

External links 

Fred Petterson's profile at Collingwood Forever

1897 births
1956 deaths
Australian rules footballers from Melbourne
Collingwood Football Club players
People from Box Hill, Victoria